Trygonorrhinidae, the banjo rays, is a family of rays, comprising eight species in three genera. They were formerly classified in the family Rhinobatidae.

Taxonomy
 Aptychotrema Norman, 1926
 Aptychotrema rostrata Shaw, 1794 (Eastern shovelnose ray)
 Aptychotrema timorensis Last, 2004 (Spotted shovelnose ray)
 Aptychotrema vincentiana Haacke, 1885 (Western shovelnose ray)
 Trygonorrhina J. P. Müller & Henle, 1838
 Trygonorrhina dumerilii (Castelnau, 1873) (Southern fiddler ray)
 Trygonorrhina fasciata J. P. Müller & Henle, 1841 (Eastern fiddler ray)
 Zapteryx D. S. Jordan & C. H. Gilbert, 1880
 Zapteryx brevirostris J. P. Müller & Henle, 1841 (Shortnose guitarfish)
 Zapteryx exasperata D. S. Jordan & C. H. Gilbert, 1880 (Banded guitarfish)
 Zapteryx xyster D. S. Jordan & Evermann, 1896 (Southern banded guitarfish)

References

 
Rhinopristiformes
Cartilaginous fish families